Anne Zenoni  (born 26 March 1971 in Albi) is a French footballer who played as a forward for the France women's national football team. She was part of the team at the UEFA Women's Euro 1997 and UEFA Women's Euro 2001. On club level she played for Toulouse FC in France. She became the UNFP Female Player of the Year in 2001.

References

External links
 
 

1971 births
Living people
French women's footballers
France women's international footballers
Sportspeople from Albi
Women's association football forwards
Footballers from Occitania (administrative region)
Toulouse FC (women) players